Jacqueline 'Jackie' Empson (born 1974) is a female British former field hockey player.

Hockey career
Empson represented England and won a silver medal, at the 1998 Commonwealth Games in Kuala Lumpur.

References

1974 births
Living people
British female field hockey players
Commonwealth Games medallists in field hockey
Commonwealth Games silver medallists for England
Field hockey players at the 1998 Commonwealth Games
Medallists at the 1998 Commonwealth Games